The Microstomidae are a family of small basal free-living flatworms (Macrostomida, Rhabditophora, Platyhelminthes), and members of the marine, brackish, freshwater meiobenthos and plankton. There are currently about 40 named species in this family.

References

External links 
Turbellarian Taxonomic Database: A listing of the taxonomy of turbellarians
Macrostomorpha Taxonomy and Phylogeny EDIT Scratchpad

Turbellaria